Benjamin Calvin Bubar Sr. (1878-July 4, 1967) was an American United Baptist minister and politician from Maine. After studying Billy Sunday, Bubar was a leading fundamentalist leader in Maine.

Personal life and family
Bubar was born in Blaine, Maine and educated in public schools as well as at Ricker Classical Institute. A United Baptist, he was the first ordained minister of that church in the state. He had six children. His children were also staunch temperance activists and involved in politics. His namesake, Benjamin Bubar Jr., was twice the Prohibition Party's nominee for President (1976 and 1980). One of his daughters, Rachel Bubar Kelly, was the Prohibition Party's nominee for vice-president in 1996. His youngest child, Paul Bubar, was one of the founders of Word of Life Fellowship.

Writing
He was the author of the first anti-evolution bill submitted to the Maine Legislature. A fierce prohibitionist, in 1911 he published a book, The Devil Let Loose in Maine about the problems of alcohol in the State. A biographical sketch published by the Maine Legislature said that the book "did much to defeat" repeal of the Maine's prohibition of the sale of alcohol in 1911.

Politics
During the 1920s, Bubar worked with the Ku Klux Klan in Maine and, December 1925, went on a speaking tour of his native Aroostook County coordinated by Klan leader DeForest H. Perkins. In 1936, the Bangor Daily News described him as "widely known in Maine as a Ku Klux Klan orator."

He was a follower of Francis Townsend, a physician who advocated for old age pensions during the Great Depression.

He was elected to the Maine House of Representatives in 1934 as a Republican. He served from 1949 to 1952 as a Progressive. He ran for governor as an Independent in 1936, finishing in third place of three with 1.89% of the vote. He was elected again to the House in 1950 and 1952. In 1951, he was known for making a passionate but ultimately failed plea in favor of an income tax over a sales tax.

References

1882 births
1967 deaths
Members of the Maine House of Representatives
People from Aroostook County, Maine
American temperance activists
Novelists from Maine
American Ku Klux Klan members
20th-century American politicians
Maine Republicans
Maine Independents
20th-century Baptist ministers from the United States